Marina Golbahari (born 1989) is an Afghan actress who earned international fame for her role as the title character in the 2003 film Osama, playing a girl who had to dress and act as a boy to support her family during the Taliban years.

Career
Golbahari was cast as Osama by the Afghan film director Siddiq Barmak, who picked her roaming on the streets of Kabul as a beggar. The movie went on to earn the Golden Globe award in the category of Best Foreign Film and Golbahari's performance was well received by many critics, including The Arizona Republic 's Richard Nilsen, who wrote, "there is no shortcoming in the acting of Marina Golbahari".

Golbahari figures prominently in the 2012 book, Shakespeare in Kabul, by Qais Akbar Omar and Stephen Landrigan.  The book chronicles a 2005 performance in the Dari of Shakespeare's Love's Labour's Lost that was presented in Kabul and then in other parts of Afghanistan the following year.

Personal life
Golbahari is married to Noorullah Azizi, who is also involved with the film industry in Afghanistan, and who also was not wealthy.

Golbahari and her husband are currently living in exile in an asylum shelter in France as Golbahari has received numerous death threats after being photographed at a South Korean film festival without her head covered.

Awards and nominations
 Molodist International Film Festival (2003) "Best Young Actor Award" for Osama

References

External links
 
 

Afghan film actresses
Afghan child actresses
Living people
People from Kabul
Date of birth missing (living people)
1989 births
21st-century Afghan actresses